James Henry McGlone (12 February 1897 – 5 September 1985) was an Australian rules footballer who played with Footscray in the Victorian Football League (VFL).

Notes

External links 

1897 births
1985 deaths
Australian rules footballers from Tasmania
Western Bulldogs players
Penguin Football Club players